Simón Ramírez may refer to:

 Simón Darío Ramírez (1930–1992), Venezuelan poet
 Simón Ramírez (footballer, born 1985), Argentine footballer
 Simón Ramírez (footballer, born 1998), Chilean footballer